Boureima Hassane Bandé (born 30 October 1998) is a Burkinabé professional footballer who plays as a striker for French  club Amiens and the Burkina Faso national team.

Club career

Mechelen 
Bandé made his professional debut for Mechelen in a 2–1 Belgian First Division A loss to Royal Antwerp F.C. on 19 August 2017, and scored his team's only goal despite coming on as a late substitute. Bandé became a first-team regular, scoring nine goals in his first fifteen games. Amid growing interest from many clubs, including Manchester United and Arsenal, on 4 December 2017, Bandé agreed to join Ajax at the end of the 2017–18 season for a reported fee of €9.5 million. He finished the season with 27 appearances and 12 goals, though Mechelen still finished bottom of the Belgian First Division and were relegated.

Ajax 
On 4 December 2017, Bandé signed for Ajax in a deal that saw him leave Mechelen after the 2017–18 season. However, Bandé broke his calf bone and raptured his ankle ligament during the preparation of the 2018–19 season in a friendly game against Anderlecht. A year later, in September 2019, he finally recovered from these injuries and was registered for Jong Ajax.

Bandé made four appearances for Jong Ajax, before he on 27 January 2020 was sent out on loan to Swiss club FC Thun until 30 June 2021. Thun was relegated at the end of the 2019–20 season and Bandé returned early to Ajax in October 2020.

On 9 February 2021, Bandé was sent on loan to Croatian First Football League club Istra 1961 for a season and a half.

Amiens
On 24 August 2022, Bandé signed a three-year contract with Amiens in France.

International career
Bandé made his professional debut for the Burkina Faso national team in a 4–0 2018 World Cup qualification win over Cape Verde on 14 November 2017.

Honours
Ajax
 Eredivisie: 2018–19
 KNVB Cup: 2018–19

References

External links
 

1998 births
Living people
People from Ouagadougou
Association football forwards
Burkinabé footballers
Burkina Faso international footballers
2021 Africa Cup of Nations players
Salitas FC players
K.V. Mechelen players
AFC Ajax players
Jong Ajax players
FC Thun players
NK Istra 1961 players
Amiens SC players
Belgian Pro League players
Eerste Divisie players
Swiss Super League players
Croatian Football League players
Burkinabé expatriate footballers
Burkinabé expatriate sportspeople in Belgium
Expatriate footballers in Belgium
Burkinabé expatriate sportspeople in the Netherlands
Expatriate footballers in the Netherlands
Burkinabé expatriate sportspeople in Switzerland
Expatriate footballers in Switzerland
Burkinabé expatriate sportspeople in Croatia
Expatriate footballers in Croatia
Burkinabé expatriate sportspeople in France
Expatriate footballers in France
21st-century Burkinabé people